Farewell is the second live album released by Christian rock band Petra. It was released in 2005. A DVD of the concert was released in 2006.

This is the band's second live album, and it was recorded during the band's Farewell tour in Franklin, Tennessee on October 4, 2005.

The concert features guest appearances by two former members of the band: singer Greg X. Volz and keyboardist John Lawry.

Track listing
 "All About Who You Know" – 3:22
 "Dance" – 4:32
 "Amazing Grace" – 4:29
 "Test of Time" – 3:22
 "Creed" – 3:14
 "Right Place" – 3:57
 "Rock Medley" – 10:05
"Sight Unseen"
"It Is Finished"
"Think Twice"
"I Am On The Rock"
"Midnight Oil"
"Mine Field"
"This Means War!"
"It Is Finished (Reprise)"
 "Jekyll & Hyde" – 3:48
 "Acoustic Set" (featuring Greg X. Volz) – 10:04
"Rose Coloured Stained Glass Windows" (1)
"Road To Zion" (1)
"More Power To Ya" (1)
"For Annie" (1)
"No Doubt" (2)
"The Coloring Song" (1)
"Love" (2)
 "Grave Robber" (featuring Greg X. Volz) – 4:20
 "Keyboard Solo" (featuring John Lawry) – 1:33
 "Beyond Belief" – 4:30
 "Guitar Solo" (featuring Bob Hartman) – 1:24
 "He Came, He Saw, He Conquered" – 4:36
(1): Lead vocals by Greg X. Volz (2): Lead vocals by John Schlitt

DVD version
The DVD version of the concert includes the same track listing as the CD. As for the special features, it includes an interview with John Schlitt, Greg X. Volz and John Lawry. The interview includes clips of another interview with band founder Bob Hartman. There are also fan interviews as they arrive the concert, and an interview to producer Peter Furler.

Another special feature is the band's rehearsal before the concert.

Missing Material
There were three songs that didn't make it into the album or DVD. They were "Judas' Kiss", "Lord I Lift Your Name on High" and "C-H-R-I-S-T-I-A-N". The first two were cut to save space, while the latter wasn't intended to be in the CD. "Just something for fun we threw in" as Hartman said. During one of the takes of Hartman's guitar solo, he broke a string. While he was fixing it, Paul Simmons delivered an impromptu drum solo which was also cut from the album and DVD. As the president of Inpop Records said "That was really spontaneous, if you remember... We did not get a clean run at it."

The live recordings of "Judas' Kiss" and "Lord, I Lift Your Name on High" eventually appeared on Bob Hartman and John Schlitt's album, performing as II Guys from Petra, Vertical Expressions.

Personnel

Petra

 John Schlitt - vocals
 Bob Hartman - guitars
 Greg Bailey - bass guitar, cello
 Paul Simmons - drums, percussion

Guest musicians

 Greg X. Volz - vocals
 John Lawry - keyboards

Production
 Petra - producer
 Wes Campbell, Peter Furler and Rob Poznanski - Executive Producers
 Jim Cooper for Lake Dog Music Group LLC - Project Coordinator

Notes

Petra (band) albums
2005 live albums
2005 video albums
Live video albums
Inpop Records live albums
Inpop Records video albums
Christian live video albums